The Huxton Creepers were an Australian rock band from Melbourne. They formed in 1984, three years after they left high school, and split in 1989. Their notable Australian hits were "My Cherie Amour", "I Will Persuade You" and their version of Manfred Mann's "Pretty Flamingo".

The lineup was Rob Craw (lead vocals and guitar), Paul Thomas (guitar and vocals), Matthew Eddy (bass) and Archie Law (drums).  All four members attended Scotch College, Melbourne, completing their HSC year in 1981. The band has reunited on a number of occasions since their original break up, including an east coast tour in 2011, supporting The Sunnyboys in 2015 and The Models in 2016.

Recording history
Their first released recording was the track "King Of The Road" (an original, not the Roger Miller song) on the Au Go Go Records Melbourne compilation Asleep At The Wheel in 1984. This and their two tracks on the Triple J compilation Cooking With George brought them to the attention of Big Time Records, their label throughout their career. Their first album was 12 Days To Paris in 1986 and their second was So This Is Paris in 1988 (titled Keep To The Beat on the U.S. and Canadian releases).

After the Huxton Creepers
Thomas went on to be a major part of the final line up of Weddings Parties Anything and later Custard. He has also played in local Melbourne bands such as Four Door Shitbox, Son of John and skiffle group The Rock Island Linesmen. He made the album Rob Knows Paul, an acoustic album of left over songs he and Craw had written for the Creepers, covers of Screaming Jay Hawkins, Johnny Thunders and NRBQ, as well as acoustic versions of This Day Is Mine and Better Days from So This Is Paris. He has also played with Archie Roach, Ruby Hunter and Nick Barker.

Craw works as a high school drama and media studies teacher. He plays in his own bands such as Rob Craw's Acoustic Dilemma and The Craw and recorded the Rob Knows Paul album with Paul Thomas. He has also written for and played with David Bridie and Monique Brumby. Craw also wrote original music for the Shakespeare play A Midsummer Night's Dream for Sacred Heart College, Newtown. Songs included "Hail the Duke" and "The Cause of True Love never did run Smooth".

Law returned to university after the band split, coming to prominence again in 2000 as director of the British mine clearance charity Mine Action Group (MAG), running a team of 400 people clearing land mines in Cambodia. He was employed by the United Nations, first in New York City and then  in Johannesburg, South Africa. Law returned to Australia in 2007, plays with the Cool Charmers and works as Save the Children Australia's Humanitarian Director.

Eddy recorded a solo album in 2000 called Egg, released by Corduroy Records. He works as a high school Indonesian and Geography teacher.

Reunions
The band reformed in June 2002 to play the Melbourne radio station 3RRR Sex Pistols Celebration at the Esplanade Hotel in St. Kilda.

The band played a show on 9 October 2009 at the Corner Hotel in Melbourne, along with The Stems, Even and The Dolly Rocker Movement.

To celebrate the re-release of their album 12 Days to Paris, the band reformed for a number of concerts on the east coast of Australia in October and November 2011.

The band played a show to support The Sunnyboys at the Forum Theatre in Melbourne on 22 March 2014.

Discography

Studio albums

Compilation albums

Singles

References

External links
 Where Are They Now - Huxton Creepers (bmusic Newsletter #69, 25–31 May 2003)
 Huxton Creepers (Ira Robbins and Doug Brod, Trouser Press)
 Different drummer hunts for landmines (transcript) (Maxine McKew, The 7.30 Report, 26 December 2000)
 Huxton Creepers (Rate Your Music)

Victoria (Australia) musical groups